Xenorhina obesa is a species of frog in the family Microhylidae.
It is found in West Papua in Indonesia and Papua New Guinea.
Its natural habitat is subtropical or tropical moist lowland forests.

References

Xenorhina
Amphibians of New Guinea
Taxonomy articles created by Polbot
Amphibians described in 1960